This is a list of central banks and currencies of Asia-Pacific.

See also
Currency
Economy of Asia
Economy of Oceania

 
Economy of Asia
Economy of Oceania